The Algerian Islamic reference is the fundamentalist and legal framework for the practice of the religion of Islam in Algeria within Sunnism under the tutelage of the Ministry of Religious Affairs and Endowments.

Reference elements

Sunnism

Algeria belongs to the Sunni world which is the Islamic community to which the vast majority of Muslims belong.

The sources of its Sunni Islamic jurisprudence are the Quran and Sunnah of Muhammad in the hadiths attributed to him.

Ash'arism
Algeria is based in its Muslim aqidah on Ash'arism which is a theological school of Islam, founded by Al-Ash'ari (873-935).

Malikism

Algeria adopts Malikism, which is one of the four Madhhabs of Sunni Muslim law, based on the teaching of Imam Malik ibn Anas (711-795).

Sufism

The Sufism is taught and practiced in more than 1,600 zawiyas in Algeria.

Quran recitation

The Tilawa of the Quran in Algerian mosques takes place according to Warsh recitation in the Salah, the Hizb Rateb and the Salka.

See also

References

Islam in Algeria